The Cachoeira do Cai Dam (}) is a planned hydroelectric dam on the Jamanxim River in the state of Pará, Brazil, with a capacity of .

Location

The Cachoeira do Cai Dam is proposed to be built on the Jamanxim River in the state of Pará, in the Tapajós river basin.
It would adjoin the Sawré Muybu Indigenous Territory, which lies between the Jamanxim and the Tapajós in the region above the point where the two rivers converge.
The hydroelectric power plant would be part of the proposed  Tapajós hydroelectric complex on the Tapajós and Jamanxim rivers.
Others are the São Luiz do Tapajós (6,133 MW), Jatobá (2,338 MW), Cachoeira dos Patos (528 MW) and Jamanxim (881 MW), all under study, as well as the less advanced proposals for the Jardim do Ouro (227 MW) and Chacorão (3,336 MW).

Technical

The project is a joint venture of Eletrobras, Eletronorte, Construções e Comércio Camargo Côrrea, EDF Consultoria em Projetos de Geração de Energia, EPP Energia Elétrica and Promoção e Participações.
The project is estimated to cost US$1.1 billion.

A "platform" approach is proposed for construction to minimise environmental impact.
There would be no access roads, and workers would be taken to the site by helicopter.
After construction is complete the site would be regenerated.

Impact

The official estimate is that 150 people will be affected.
A study released in December 2015 took into account carbon and methane emissions from the reservoir and from construction and concluded that there was a high probability that the plant would generate emissions comparable to a natural gas plant, and a possibility that emissions could exceed those of a coal-fired plant.

Notes

Sources

Hydroelectric power stations in Brazil
Dams in Pará
Proposed hydroelectric power stations
Proposed renewable energy power stations in Brazil